WUT, Wut or wut may refer to:

Acronyms and abbreviations
 Warsaw University of Technology, in Poland
 Wroclaw University of Technology, in Poland
 Wuhan University of Technology, in China
 Xinzhou Wutaishan Airport, in China (IATA code)
 Wichita Union Terminal Railway, a railroad in Kansas

Other uses
 Wut (album), by Hämatom, 2008
 Wut Tola (born 2002), Cambodian footballer
 Wut Hmone Shwe Yi (born 1988), Burmese actress

See also 
 Wut Wut, a 2018 album by Dillon Francis
 Wat (disambiguation)
 Watt (disambiguation)
 What (disambiguation)